Kelvin Arase (born 15 January 1999) is an Austrian professional footballer who plays as a winger for Belgian club Oostende on loan from the German club Karlsruher SC.

Club career

Early career
Born in Benin City in 1999, Arase started his football career with SR Donaufeld Wien youth team in 2009. In 2011, Arase moved to Rapid Wien youth team.

Rapid Wien
In 2016, Arase was called up for Rapid Wien first team. On 19 September 2016, Arase made his Austrian Bundesliga debut against SV Mattersburg at Allianz Stadion, replacing Louis Schaub at the 86th minute by coach Mike Büskens. On 13 August 2019, Arase was loaned out to SV Ried. However, he was recalled after only two weeks due to injuries in the Rapid Wien squad.

Oostende
On 20 January 2023, Arase was loaned to Oostende in Belgium until the end of the 2022–23 season.

Career statistics

Club

References

Living people
1999 births
Nigerian emigrants to Austria
Sportspeople from Benin City
Austrian footballers
Nigerian footballers
Association football midfielders
Austria youth international footballers
Austria under-21 international footballers
SK Rapid Wien players
SV Horn players
SV Ried players
Karlsruher SC players
K.V. Oostende players
Austrian Football Bundesliga players
2. Liga (Austria) players
Austrian Regionalliga players
2. Bundesliga players
Austrian expatriate footballers
Austrian expatriate sportspeople in Germany
Expatriate footballers in Germany
Austrian expatriate sportspeople in Belgium
Expatriate footballers in Belgium